Farhi or Ferhi may refer to:

Surname
 Anna Farhi, Israeli volleyballer
 Daniel Farhi, French liberal rabbi
 Eddy Ferhi, French retired professional ice hockey goaltender
 Edward Farhi, American theoretical physicist
 Emmanuel Farhi, French-American economist
 Haim Farhi, Turkish chief advisor of Syrian Jewish descent
 Joseph Shabbethai Farhi, Talmudic scholar and kabbalist of the 19th century
 Moris Farhi, Turkish writer
 Naima Farhi, Algerian politician
 Nicole Farhi, French fashion designer

See also

 Fahri

Arabic-language surnames
Turkish-language surnames